Niykee Heaton is an American singer-songwriter. She has written and recorded material since her childhood, having started sharing original songs occasionally on YouTube in 2011, for which she accompanied herself on acoustic guitar, along with covers of contemporary hits, where they subsequently went viral in following years, helping to propel the singer to prominence. Heaton released her debut project, an extended play titled Bad Intentions, in September 2014, after signing a record deal with Steve Rifkind and Russell Simmons's Capitol-affiliate All Def Digital, in partnership with Awesomeness Music. The EP garnered positive online reception, with The Huffington Post writing that it "offers a significant variety for a debut, all held together by her vocals, most ravishing in her lower register" and Idolator adding that it "confidently showcases the versatility and scope of Niykee's songwriting."

In 2015, she called out her label in an extensive open letter to her fans, later clarifying that "we are now in a place where we can create music that I want to create, and we are no longer tied to the people that were holding me back," also announcing plans to release her first album. In June, she launched a website, NBK (Naturyl Born Killers), stating "NBK is the movement," where new music was then premiered for free regularly over the following months through her SoundCloud account. On March 18, 2016, Heaton released The Bedroom Tour Playlist, through Capitol Records, a mixtape compiling remixed and remastered material she had shared online and debuted on live shows from her first headlining concert tour, The Bedroom Tour, in previous months.

Songs

References

External links
Niykee Heaton on YouTube
Niykee Heaton on SoundCloud
Niykee Heaton discography at MTV.com
Niykee Heaton songs at AllMusic

Heaton, Niykee